Jac Morgan (born 21 January 2000) is a Welsh international rugby union player. Morgan plays in the backrow. He plays rugby for the Ospreys.

Early life 
Morgan was born in Sketty, Wales. He gave up a mechanical engineering apprenticeship to pursue professional rugby union.

Club career 
Morgan came through the Scarlets academy and made his debut in the Challenge Cup clash with London Irish in November 2019. Morgan then scored his first professional try in the Pro 14 defeat to Ulster.

After returning from a knee injury in February, Morgan crossed for two tries in a man-of-the-match display against Benetton, before putting in 25 tackles to help the Scarlets claim a crucial victory over Edinburgh. This led to Morgan being voted Scarlets Player of the Month for February.

In March 2021, it was announced that Morgan would join local rivals Ospreys following expiration of his contract.

He began his Ospreys career in great form, being awarded man of the match in their 18–10 victory over Munster on 23 October 2021. He was overlooked for selection for the Wales for the upcoming Autumn test series, despite recognition from press and pundits alike.

Morgan was named man of the match on 20 January 2023, scoring an 88th minute try as the Ospreys beat Leicester Tigers at Welford Road, securing their place in the knockouts of the 2022–23 Champions Cup.

Morgan can play at blindside, number eight, and openside flanker. He is relatively small compared to most,  but not all, top international players in these positions.

International career

In the Six Nations Under 20s Championship 2019-20 he captained Wales and achieved more turnovers than any other player in this tournament. He was called up to the senior Wales squad for the 2022 Six Nations Championship.

Morgan made his senior Wales debut on 12 February 2022 in the 20-17 victory over Scotland. 

Morgan was controversially dropped by Wales coach Wayne Pivac, ahead of the 2022 tour of South Africa.

Consistent performances for the Ospreys saw him recalled to the Welsh squad for the 2022 end-of-year rugby union internationals. Morgan scored four tries in two matches, gaining plaudits from the press despite an overall poor series for the side.

Morgan retained his place in the Welsh squad for the 2023 Six Nations. He showed his versatility early on in the tournament, starting the first match against Ireland as a blindside flanker, before moving to number eight in the following fixture against Scotland.

International tries

References

External links

WRU profile
Ospreys profile

2000 births
Living people
Scarlets players
Rugby union flankers
Ospreys (rugby union) players
Welsh rugby union players
Wales international rugby union players
Rugby union players from Carmarthen